Rudraksham (Malayalam: രുദ്രാക്ഷം) is a 1994 action Malayalam film starring Suresh Gopi, Annie and Devan. Written by Ranjith and directed by Shaji Kailas. The film was criticized for extreme violence.

Plot
Due to his passion for farming and agriculture, Vishwanathan sacrifices his job in an MNC and settles in his village. One day, Viswanathan gets a call from Hyderabad that his sister Revathi, who is studying medicine at a medical college has been missing for the past couple of days. Vishwanathan sets out to Hyderabad on the same day in a tourist bus. The bus, which is on a trip to Tirupati, is packed with a set of religious Tamil-speaking Hindu pilgrims. Gowri, who is among the pilgrims, grabs his attention for her singing abilities. Upon reaching Hyderabad, Vishwanathan reaches the college, and from her friends learns that Revathi had received threats from  Sudhakar Reddy, son of a syndicate gangster named Reddy. 

Revathi, who had witnessed a murder committed by Sudhakar, had planned to appear at an identification parade at the police station. Sudhkar in fury, tries to assault her, and in an effort to save herself, she falls down from the top of a building and dies. Vishwanathan visits the nearby police station to file a complaint, but gets a cold response from the local inspector, who threatens to arrest Vishwanathan, if he decides to move ahead with the complaint. Vishwanathan gets enraged, where he gets into a scuffle with Sudhakar, and kills him, which causes Reddy to hunt for Vishwanathan, who is saved by Reddy's rival Patel. Vishwanathan is made to stay at a brothel run by Patel, where he meets a good-hearted chap named Appu. At the brothel, Vishwanathan is shocked to see Gowri, where he learns from Appu that she was trapped and kidnapped at Tirupathi and has been sold to Patel by a lady pimp. 

On meeting Vishwanathan, Gowri pleads with him to save her. At night, she injures CI Rao. Vishwanathan decides to save her and is helped by Appu in finding a route outside. Appu introduces him to Jose, a truck driver from Kerala and his sidekick Kunjahammed, but Appu is killed by the Patel's goons. Vishwanathan flees from the brothel with Gowri and is followed by Patel and his goons. On another side, Reddy is also after him. Their chase turns more violent as they face several hardships on the path, including many local criminals. After a bloodshedding fight, Vishwanathan succeeds in saving Gowri by killing both Patel and Reddy.

Cast
Suresh Gopi as Vishwanathan
Annie as Gouri
Geetha as Rathnam
Maathu as Revathi
Vijayaraghavan as Joseph
Devan as Patel
R. N. Sudarshan as Reddy
K. B. Ganesh Kumar as Sudhakar Reddy
Rajan P. Dev as Nair, Reddy's henchman
Chithra as Doctor
Augustine as Kunjahammad
Bheeman Raghu as Thankachan
Vijayakumar as Hari
Maniyanpilla Raju as Appu
Bobby Kottarakkara as Mahesh, Hospital Attandant
T. P. Madhavan as Appunni Nair
Sadiq as CI Ramanathan
Vinu Chakravarthy as CI Rao
Abu Salim as Arumugam, Patel's henchman
T.S. Krishnan
Tony

Production
This film had just one song, which was penned by Renji Panicker. It was on the sets of this film that director Shaji Kailas fell in love with Annie. They got married a year later. This was the second film of Annie. She made a stunning come back and became the most popular heroine of her time. She went on to act in more than a dozen films during the next year.

Legacy 
Due to the success of the film, Shaji Kailas and Ranjith collaborated for blockbuster films like  Asuravamsam, Aaram Thamburan, Narasimham and Valliettan.

References

External links
 

Films directed by Shaji Kailas
1990s Malayalam-language films
1990s crime action films
1994 films
Films scored by Sharreth
Films about organised crime in India
Indian crime action films
Films with screenplays by Ranjith